Cavour is a station on Line B of the Rome Metro, opened on 10 February 1955. It is located on via Cavour, in the Monti rione of Rome, midway between Santa Maria Maggiore and via dei Fori Imperiali.

Nearby 
 Imperial forums
 Parco di Traiano
 Trajan's Market
 Palazzo Del Grillo
 Palazzo Koch, HQ of the Banca d'Italia
 Engineering faculty of the "la Sapienza"
 San Pietro in Vincoli
 Viminal Hill

Streets and piazzas 
 Via dei Serpenti
 Via del Boschetto
 Via Panisperna
 Piazza della Suburra
 Salita dei Borgia

Churches 
 San Pietro in Vincoli
 Madonna dei Monti - Church of Santa Maria dei Monti
 Basilica di Santa Maria Maggiore
 San Martino ai Monti
 Basilica di Santa Prassede
 Basilica di Santa Pudenziana

References

External links 

The station on ATAC.

Rome Metro Line B stations
Railway stations opened in 1955
1955 establishments in Italy
Rome R. I Monti
Railway stations in Italy opened in the 20th century